Into the Widening World is a 1995 collection of 26 short fictional coming-of-age stories.  It was written by many authors including: Nadine Gordimer, Ben Okri, Bharati Mukherjee, Alice Munro and Gabriel Garcia Marquez.

Stories

South America and the Caribbean

"Columba"- Michelle Cliff
Jamaica

"Weight-Reducing Diet"- Jorge Edwards
Chile

"On Sunday"- Mario Vargas
Argentina

"Artificial Roses"- Gabriel Garcia Marquez
Colombia

"The Raffle"- V. S. Naipaul
Trinidad

North America

"Exchange Value"- Charles Johnson
United States

"Borders"- Thomas King
Canada

"Saints"- Bharati Mukherjee
United States

"The Turkey Season"- Alice Munro
Canada

Europe and Russia

"The Gifts of War"- Margaret Drabble
Great Britain

"The Nothingness Forest"- Margareta Ekstrom
Sweden

"Christmas"- John McGahern
Ireland

"That Wall, That Mimosa"- Merce Rodoreda
Catalonia/Spain

"Date with a bird"- Tatyana Tolstaaya
Russia

Africa and the Middle East

"Turkish Soldier from Edirne"- Missiim Aloni
Israel

"Some Are Born to Sweet Delight"- Nadine Gordimer
South Africa

"The Conjurer Made Off with the Dish"- Naguib Mahfouz
Egypt

"Who Will Stop the Dark?"- Charles Mungoshi
Zimbabwe

"In the Shadow of War"- Ben Okri
Nigeria

"When the Train Comes"- Zoe Wicomb
South Africa

Asia and the South Pacific

"American Dreams"- Peter Carey
Australia

"In Broad Daylight"- Ha Jin
China

"Mr. Tang's Girls"- Shirley Geok-lin Lim
Malaysia

"Martyrdom"- Yukio Mishima
Japan

"One Sunday"- Rohinton Mistry
India

Babaru, the Family- B. Wongar
Australia

Editing and publication

Edited by: John Loughery
Copyright: 1995 by John Loughery
Published by:  Persea Books, Ink. 171 Madison Avenue.  New York, New York 10016

All rights reserved

Fiction anthologies
1995 anthologies
Coming-of-age fiction